Jermie Dwayne Lynch  (Nicknames: Jeremie, Jemie, Mai Linh, born 24 March 1991) is a Jamaican professional footballer who plays as a striker for the V.League 1 club Topenland Bình Định. In 2012 he made his only appearance for the Jamaica national team.

Early life 
Lynch has Jamaican parents. He has been playing football since early childhood. He has always been an avid Chelsea fan and supporter. He is Christian.

Club career
Lynch began his career with Harbour View. In July 2013, Lynch went on trial with El Salvadorian club Luis Ángel Firpo, before signing a loan deal with the club a few days later.

Lynch signed with USL expansion side Saint Louis FC in March 2015. He scored the club's first ever regular-season goal during a match against the Tulsa Roughnecks at ONEOK Field on 2 April 2015.

On 28 July 2016, Lynch was loaned to the Wilmington Hammerheads of the USL for the remainder of the season, and his contract, after struggling to earn playing time with the first team at Saint Louis FC. In his first game at his new club he scored a goal in a 4–1 loss to the Pittsburgh Riverhounds.

Lynch was released by Saint Louis FC on 9 November 2016.

International career
Lynch made his international debut for Jamaica in 2012.

International goals
Scores and results list Jamaica's goal tally first.

Achievements

Club
	Topenland Bình Định
V.League 1:
 Third place: 2022
Vietnamese National Cup:
 Runners-up: 2022

References

1991 births
Living people
Jamaican footballers
Association football forwards
Harbour View F.C. players
C.D. Luis Ángel Firpo footballers
Saint Louis FC players
Wilmington Hammerheads FC players
USL Championship players
V.League 1 players
Than Quang Ninh FC players
Haiphong FC players
Jamaica international footballers
Jamaican expatriate footballers
Expatriate footballers in El Salvador
Jamaican expatriate sportspeople in El Salvador
Expatriate soccer players in the United States
Jamaican expatriate sportspeople in Vietnam
Expatriate footballers in Vietnam